Tettigidea empedonepia, the Torreya pygmy grasshopper, is a species of grasshopper in the family Tetrigidae. The type locality is Camp Torreya in Liberty County, Florida. According to Orthoptera Species File, it has also been found in Cuba.

References

Tetrigidae
Orthoptera of North America
Insects described in 1937
Taxonomy articles created by Polbot